Kacamchand "Danny" Ramnarais (born 20 June 1964 in Guyana) was a Guyanese and Canadian cricket player. He played three first-class matches in the mid-1980s, and later played for the Canadian national team in two ICC Trophy tournaments plus the 1998 Commonwealth Games.

References
Cricket Archive player profile

1964 births
Living people
Guyanese cricketers
Guyana cricketers
Berbice cricketers
Canadian cricketers
Cricketers at the 1998 Commonwealth Games
People from East Berbice-Corentyne
Commonwealth Games competitors for Canada
Wicket-keepers